Iveta Benešová and Barbora Záhlavová-Strýcová were the defending champions but chose to participate at the 2012 Dubai Tennis Championships instead.

Sara Errani and Roberta Vinci won the title over Kimiko Date-Krumm and Zhang Shuai.

Seeds

Draw

Draw

References
 Main Draw

Monterrey Open - Doubles
Monterrey Open